Miss Pakistan World is a beauty pageant for women of Pakistani descent from around the world. The event is held annually in Canada.

History
The pageant was originally launched in 2002 by Sonia Ahmed under the name of Miss Canada Pakistan. The organizers held the event in Canada due to security concerns and the general attitude towards pageants held by the Pakistani public. The pageant has taken place in Canada every year since with the exception of 2014, which was held in New Jersey. The first Miss Pakistan World to be crowned was Zehra Sheerazi on 1 February 2003. The first Miss Pakistan World to be crowned on the soil of Pakistan is the reigning titleholder of 2020, Areej Chaudhary. On 23 May 2021, Miss Pakistan World announced that it would allow trans women to compete in a separate pageant called Miss Trans Pakistan. Shyraa Roy became the first trans woman to win the Miss Trans Pakistan 2021 title.

Titleholders

Miss Pakistan World

Mrs Pakistan World

Mrs. Pakistan World is a beauty pageant hosted in Toronto for married women of Pakistani descent. The contest was launched in 2007 with Misbah Yasin–Iqbal being the first winner. Saiyma Haroon, Mrs. Pakistan World 2012 was the first Pakistani married woman to win from Norway. In 2018, Usma Kashaf was sent to Lady of Brilliancy in Taiwan and won the title "Lady of Popularity" for Pakistan. In 2020, Ravish Zahid–Thomas became the first Catholic Pakistani to win Mrs. Pakistan World.
In 2022 the first Mrs. Pakistan World was crowned on the soil of Pakistan. Nida Khan was the first married woman at age 26 to be crowned in Lahore, Pakistan.

Miss Trans Pakistan 
On 23 May 2021, the first Miss Trans Pakistan was announced. The crowning ceremony took place in Lahore, Pakistan on 25 May 2021.

Editions

In January 2022, Sonia Ahmed began the first pageant on Pakistani soil in Lahore, Pakistan. This was initiated after the successful launch of the Miss Trans Pakistan pageant on 25 May 2021. The ceremony for the winners of Miss Pakistan, Mrs. Pakistan and Mr. Pakistan took place on 31 January 2022.

Pakistan Edition 2023

Pakistan Edition 2022

Overseas Edition

Big Four pageants representatives
The following women have represented Pakistan in two of the Big Four international beauty pageants major international beauty pageants for women.

Miss Earth Pakistan
Following are the representatives of Pakistan at Miss Earth pageant.

Representatives to minor international pageants

The following women have represented Pakistan in many minor international beauty pageants for women.

Miss Supranational Pakistan
Following are the representatives of Pakistan at Miss Supranational pageant.

Miss Grand International Pakistan
Following are the representatives of Pakistan at Miss Grand International pageant.

Miss Asia Pacific International Pakistan
Following are the representatives of Pakistan at Miss Asia Pacific International pageant.

Controversies
The pageant has been criticized by Pakistani feminist Amna Buttar of the Asian-American Network Against Abuse of Human Rights, who wrote in an email to the New York Times, "In Pakistan, we are trying to get basic rights for women: right to marry, right to divorce, equal opportunity for job and education, and issues like Miss Pakistan create problems for this movement. An average Pakistani young woman does not want to wear a bikini in public, and for her it is important to have equal opportunity and all focus should be on that, and not on a pageant where only the elite can participate." Sonia Ahmed, the president of Miss Pakistan World, defended the event as a movement for self-expression, saying that the participants have the freedom to do as they wish.  In 2006, Culture Ministry official Abdul Hafeez Chaudhry questioned the wearing of bikinis to represent Pakistan.

In 2010 the organizers were criticized for holding the pageant in Ramadan and during the 2010 Pakistan floods.

See also
Sonia Ahmed
Mrs. Pakistan World

References

External links
 Miss Pakistan World website
 Mrs Pakistan World
 Miss Trans Pakistan website

Pakistani awards
Women in Pakistan
Pakistan
Pakistan

Beauty pageants in Pakistan
Beauty pageants for people of specific ethnic or national descents